This is a timeline of the history of the British broadcaster Westcountry Television (later known as ITV Westcountry, and now part of ITV West Country). Westcountry provided the ITV service for the South West of England from 1993 to 2009, after which the service name "ITV West Country" has been used across the West and South West of England.

1990s 
 1991
 16 October – The ITC announces that TSW has lost its licence to broadcast to south west England. It loses out to Westcountry Television. Westcountry had tabled a lower bid but the ITC awarded the licence to Westcountry because it felt that TSW’s bid of £16.1 million was too high. Westcountry was the second highest of the other two applicants and was awarded the licence with a bid of £7.82 million per year.
 1992
 6 February – TSW’s appeal to have the ITC’s decision to relieve TSW of its licence fails when the House of Lords rejects the appeal.
 1993
 1 January – After the chimes of Big Ben, Westcountry Television goes on air. 
 20 July –  Westcountry joins up with HTV, Meridian, Channel Television and S4C to form a joint advertising company operated by Meridian Broadcasting and HTV.
 1994
 No events.
 1995
 No events.
 1996
 25 November – Carlton Communications buys Westcountry Television.
 1997
 No events.
 1998
 15 November – The public launch of digital terrestrial TV in the UK takes place.
 1999
 6 September – Carlton Television drops the Westcountry name from their on-air presentation, instead branding the region as Carlton Westcountry.
 8 November – A new, hearts-based on-air look is introduced.

2000s 
 2000
 No events.
 2001
 No events.
 2002
 28 October – On-air regional identities are dropped apart from when introducing regional programmes and Westcountry is renamed ITV1 for the Westcountry.
 2003
 No events.
 2004
 January – The final two remaining English ITV companies, Carlton and Granada, merge to create a single England and Wales ITV company called ITV plc and the region is known on air when introducing regional programming as ITV1 Westcountry.
2005
 No events.
 2006
 No events.
 2007
 12 September – ITV issues a statement to the City of London, saying that it wished to merge ITV West with ITV Westcountry to form a non-franchise region, ITV West and Westcountry, from February 2009.
 2008
 December – All non-news local programming ends after Ofcom gives ITV permission to drastically cut back its regional programming. From 2009 the only regional programme is the monthly political discussion show
 2009
 15 February – Westcountry Live is broadcast for the final time.
 16 February – As part of major cutbacks across ITV to its regional broadcasts in England the operations of ITV Westcountry and ITV West are merged into a new non-franchise region ITV West & Westcountry. The new ‘region’ results in a merged regional news service based in Bristol called The West Country Tonight. However the first half of the main programme and the entirety of the late evening bulletin remain separate.
 9 September – The Westcountry region completes digital switchover.

2010s
2010
 No events.
2011
 5 September – Separate weekday daytime bulletins for the two main regions - west and south west - are reintroduced.
2012
 No events.
2013
 16 September – The south west opt-out from the Bristol-based regional news magazine is restored as fully separate regional programmes on weekdays with shorter daytime and weekend bulletins reintroduced.
2014
1 January – Following the formal split of the Wales and West of England regions, a new region covering the merged west and south west regions - ITV West Country - is officially launched.

See also 
 History of ITV
 History of ITV television idents
 Timeline of ITV
 Timeline of TSW – Westcountry's predecessor

References

Television in the United Kingdom by year
ITV timelines